Directory of Nobility is a comprehensive directory of the nobility of a country or area. The best known such directory is the German Almanach de Gotha ("The Gotha") and its successor, the Genealogisches Handbuch des Adels.

Biographical dictionaries
European nobility
Genealogy publications
Directories

cs:Adelskalender
de:Adelskalender
nl:Adelskalender